Peak Hill is a town in Parkes Shire in the Central West of New South Wales, Australia.
It is located on the Newell Highway and the Parkes to Narromine railway line.

History
Before the arrival of Europeans, the Peak Hill area was part of the Wiradjuri people's lands. In 1817, the explorer John Oxley and his party were the first Europeans in the region. 
In 1889, Gold was discovered in the area, and later that year Peak Hill was gazetted in November 1889. The Post office opened on 7 November 1889, and the Bureau of Meteorology's weather station began in 1965.
The first public wheat silo built in Australia was constructed at Peak Hill in 1918 after government surveys indicated the district had great potential as a wheat-producing region.

Agriculture
The district is also a renowned sheep producing area, particularly medium-woolled merinos. There are also five merino studs actively operating in the area, namely Cora Lynn, Genanegie, Towalba, Towonga and Westray. Rams from these studs have been sold throughout Australia, and they all have on-property hoggett ram sales in September, supplying commercial sheep breeders with high-quality young rams to breed from.

Climate

Facilities

Peak Hill has a Catholic primary school St Joseph's, and a public central school.

Peak Hill has three motels, one hotel and two caravan parks. It also has a post office, RSL club, bowling club, golf club, cafes, antique shops, newsagency, supermarket, butcher shop, art gallery, book shop, hairdressers and beauty salons. There is a showground that has harness races and an annual agricultural show.

Peak Hill offers many tourist attractions such as the open cut gold mine, flora and fauna reserve nature walk, Bogan Weir, Australia's first upright wheat silo, heritage listed hospital, arts and crafts, Big Fish fossil hut, and a unique street facade which takes visitors back in time.

The local community operates a volunteer-run radio station: PeakHillFM89.5. The station provides a round-the-clock service of classic hits seven days per week.

Peak Hill styles itself as 'The Town With a Heart of Gold' to reflect its proximity to the goldmine, and lends its facilities as a base for tourists of Wiradjuri Country.

Silos

Peak Hill's central position in the New South Wales wheat belt may have been the reason why Peak Hill became the site for Australia's first upright bulk wheat silo in 1918. It was not until 1927 that the next stage, the six-bin silos and weighbridge complex, was completed at Peak Hill. In 1950 the construction of three additional 50,000-bushel bins was carried out and the bulkhead was completed in 1959.

After viewing the current silo, it will become apparent that they have grown substantially over the years to cope with the local grain production. A lot of locally grown grain is also taken over to the Parkes silo.

The Peak Hill silo can be viewed from Lindner Avenue, which runs parallel with the railway line.

War Memorials 
Peak Hill has a war memorial at the Peak Hill Cemetery located north of the town on the Newell Highway.

There is also the AIF War Memorial School of Arts, the War Memorial park, and the War Memorial Pool.

Places to stay 
Double D Caravan Park

Oasis Motel

Club House Hotel

Places to see 
Post Office

Lindner Corner

Railway Station

Wheat Silos

Club House Hotel

Carrington Hotel

CBC Bank

Hospital

St James Church

St Joseph's Primary School

Sisters of Mercy Convent

Masonic Hall

ANZ Bank

AIF Memorial School of Arts

Recreation Areas 
War Memorial Park

Lindner Oval and Recreational area

Commercial Gardens

Bogan River reserve

War Memorial Pool

Bowling Club

Golf Club

Arts and Crafts 
Many arts and crafts are represented in the community.

Notable People
 Graham Murray, rugby league player and coach

 Willie Tonga, Rugby League Player 

 Esi Tonga, Rugby League Player, Entrepreneur 
 Hanley, Kitty (Kate) (c. 1845–1917) Wiradjuri Elder and midwife

References

Towns in the Central West (New South Wales)
Newell Highway
Parkes Shire
Mining towns in New South Wales